Samyang Foods Co., Ltd. is an international South Korean food manufacturer and the first instant ramen company in South Korea. Samyang Food was founded on September 15, 1961 by Jeon Jung Yoon. In 1963, Samyang Food debuted the first Korean instant noodle.

History 
In the early 1970s, Samyang Foods converted a 20 km2 Daegwallyeong forest into a grassland to raise livestock.

In 2010, Jeon In Jang became the company's chairman.  The company is now placed third to fourth in the instant noodle market of Korea. Samyang Foods started exporting their products, increasing the company's profits.  Recently, the company took over several restaurant chains to expand into the food service industry.

In 2012, Samyang Foods released its Buldak Spicy Chicken Ramen. The new Buldak Spicy Chicken flavor became popular in the YouTube community.

In 2012, Samyang Foods along with several other companies in the Instant Noodles market, including Nongshim, Ottogi, and Korea Yakult, were fined by the Korean Fair Trade Commission for fixing instant noodles prices from 2001 to 2010.

In 2019, Hyundai Development Co., a large shareholder of Samyang Foods with 16.99% stake, pushes for the suspension of board directors with criminal records.

In 2019, Samyang Foods establishes Samyang Japan, its first overseas sales unit. This expansion is due to Japan’s large ramen market, approximately $5.4 billion US dollars of ramen consumption.

In 2020, Samyang Foods launches its new kimchi-flavored Buldak spicy noodles to meet consumer demands and interests in “fire noodles”.

On March 19, 2021, Samyang Foods Co. announced its sales reached a new high due to the increased demands for its instant noodles during the coronavirus pandemic. Samyang Foods Co.’s operating profit increased by 21.9% since last year.

Legal Issues
In the 1980s, Samyang Food began producing other products such as snacks, dairy products, and sauces.  The demand for instant noodles in Korea increased, followed by increasing exports to Japan and the United States.  In 1989, allegations arose that Samyang used unsafe industrial oil in their noodles.  Although ultimately cleared of any wrongdoing, this scandal harmed the company's reputation, and contributed to ending its dominance in the instant noodle market. 

In 2018, Samyang Foods Co. reached an agreement with its U.S. subsidiary, Samyang USA, to resolve a nearly $1 billion US dollar legal battle. Samyang USA paid $4.1 million in reparation.

In 2019, the settlement of two class actions against Defendant Samyang Foods Co. have been approved by the Supreme Court of British Columbia and the Superior Court of Justice of Ontario. Terms of settlement include that Samyang Foods pay $288,586.98 dollars in compensation. 

On January 25, 2019, Samyang chairman Jeon In Jang was sentenced to prison for 3 years for embezzling $5 billion Won (USD $4.43 million) of his company's funds. His wife and CEO of Samyang, Kim Jung-soo, was given a 2-year prison term, albeit suspended for 3 years, on the same charges. Since Jeon's imprisonment, Kim has assumed her husband's leadership duties.

Chronology 
 September 1961: First established the Samyang Dairy Corporation
 October 1961: Changed the name to Samyang Industrial Co., Ltd
 September 1963: Produced Korea's first instant noodle
 October 1965: Changed to Samyang Food Industrial Co., Ltd
 November 1967: Moved to Dobong Plant from Wolgok Plant
 January 1969: Established Samyang Dairy Products
 November 1973: Started construction of Daegwallyeong grassland
 January 1978: Established Samyang Oil Industry
 October 1978: Opening of the Samyang Medical Corporation
 November 1989: Industrial oil scandal
 June 1990: Changed the name to Samyang Food Industrial Co., Ltd

Products
 Samyang ramen
 Hot Chicken Flavor Ramen
 Samyang bowl & cup noodles
 Samyang snacks
 Refined sugar

Affiliates of Samyang (Samyang family) 
 Samyang Ranch
 Ho Myeon Dang
 Ho myeon dang (Premium Noodle House) 
 Gourmet Ho myeon dang (Gourmet Noodles and Comfort Food)
 Ho myeon and Ban (Oriental Noodle Shop)
 Lamen's (We Know Korean Flavor)
 Samyang Sae A-chim
 Samyang Jeju Milk

See also 
 List of companies of South Korea

References

Sources
 http://www.etnews.com/20171027000329
 http://news.mk.co.kr/newsRead.php?&year=2017&no=88786
 http://www.sportsseoul.com/news/read/514659
 http://news.mk.co.kr/newsRead.php?&year=2017&no=107740

External link
 

Food and drink companies of South Korea
Food manufacturers of South Korea
Manufacturing companies based in Seoul
South Korean brands
Instant noodle brands
Food and drink companies established in 1961
Companies listed on the Korea Exchange
South Korean companies established in 1961
Multinational companies headquartered in South Korea